Siirt District is the central district of Siirt Province in Turkey. The municipality of Siirt is its seat. The district had a population of 172,824 in 2021.

Settlements 
The district encompasses the municipality of Eruh, the belde of Gökçebağ, thirty-five villages and thirty-seven hamlets.

Villages 

 Akdoğmuş
 Aktaş
 Akyamaç
 Bağlıca
 Bayraktepe
 Beşyol
 Bostancık
 Çağbaşı
 Demirkaya
 Doluharman
 Eğlence
 Ekmekçiler
 İnkapı
 Kalender
 Kavaközü
 Kayaboğaz
 Kemerli
 Kışlacık
 Koçlu
 Konacık
 Köprübaşı
 Meşelidere
 Meydandere
 Ormanardı
 Pınarca
 Pınarova
 Sağırsu
 Sağlarca
 Sarıtepe
 Tuzkuyusu
 Yağmurtepe
 Yazlıca
 Yerlibahçe
 Yokuşbağları
 Zorkaya

References 

Districts of Siirt Province